Thomas Durkin (18 April 1895 – March 1958) was an English professional rugby league footballer who played in the 1910s and 1920s. He played at club level St. Helens (Heritage № 227) and Wakefield Trinity (Heritage № 279), as a forward (prior to the specialist positions of), during the era of contested scrums.

Background
Thomas Durkin worked as a labourer at Pilkington's plate glassworks, and he died aged 62 in St. Helens, Lancashire, England.

Playing career

Challenge Cup Final appearances
Thomas Durkin played as a forward, i.e. number 12, in St. Helens' 3-37 defeat by Huddersfield in the 1915 Challenge Cup Final during the 1914–15 season at Watersheddings, Oldham on Saturday 1 May 1915, in front of a crowd of 8,000.

Notable tour matches
Thomas Durkin played as a forward, i.e. number 11, in Wakefield Trinity's 3-29 defeat by Australia in the 1921–22 Kangaroo tour of Great Britain match during the 1921–22 season at Belle Vue, Wakefield on Saturday 22 October 1921.

Club career
Thomas Durkin made his dêbut for St. Helens in the 17-0 victory over Swinton at Knowsley Road, St. Helens on Saturday 25 January 1913, he played his last match for St. Helens in the 15-8 victory over Leigh at Knowsley Road, St. Helens on Friday 22 April 1921, he was transferred from St. Helens to Wakefield Trinity prior to the 1921–22 season, he made his dêbut for Wakefield Trinity during October 1921, and he played his last match for Wakefield Trinity during the 1922–23 season.

References

External links
Search for "Durkin" at rugbyleagueproject.org

1895 births
1958 deaths
English rugby league players
Rugby league forwards
Rugby league players from St Helens, Merseyside
St Helens R.F.C. players
Wakefield Trinity players